Øyslebø is a village in Lindesnes municipality in Agder county, Norway.

Name
The village of Øyslebø (Old Norse: Øyðslubœr) is named after the old Øyslebø farm, where Øyslebø Church is located. The name is derived from the old river name, Øyðsla.  The name was previously spelled Øslebø or Øislebø.

References

External links

Villages in Agder
Lindesnes